KINY (800 AM) is a full service formatted broadcast radio station licensed to Juneau, Alaska, serving Alaska Panhandle.  KINY is owned and operated by Alaska Broadcast Communications.

History
KINY began broadcasting on May 31, 1935, at 7:30 PM.  It was located in the Goldstein Building until 1939, when the building was destroyed by fire on February 8, 1939.  The Decker Building in downtown Juneau then served as KINY's headquarters for decades.  The station moved into the building on October 28, 1940.  The Decker Building burned down in June 1984.

KINY and its sister station KSUP were bought by Alaska Broadcast Communications in June 2008.

The callsign letters have no backstory, as KINY was just a government-issued designation.

Programming
News of the North - news about Alaska.
Capital Chat, a local-events show for the Juneau, Alaska area hosted by Steve Holloway.
Problem Corner, a local show for buying, selling, etc., hosted by Wade Bryson.

Notable regular syndicated broadcasts include:
The Mike Harvey Show, a syndicated requested oldies show hosted by Mike Harvey.
Super Gold, hosted by Mike Harvey.
American Top 40 with Casey Kasem.

KINY carries news from ABC Radio News and live sports from the Seattle Mariners and the Seattle Seahawks.

Translators

In addition to the main station, KINY has an additional five translators to widen its broadcast area.

References

External links
FCC History Cards for KINY
 Hometown Radio 800 and 103.5 KINY Online

1935 establishments in Alaska
Radio stations established in 1935
INY
Full service radio stations in the United States